David Andrew Burd (born March 15, 1988), better known by his stage name Lil Dicky, is an American rapper, comedian, and actor. He came to prominence with the release of the music video for his song "Ex-Boyfriend" in 2013, which became popular with more than one million views on YouTube in 24 hours. He released his debut album, Professional Rapper, in 2015.

In 2018, his song "Freaky Friday", featuring Chris Brown, became a worldwide hit. He also gained attention for his 2019 music video "Earth", which featured many singers and actors including Ariana Grande, Justin Bieber, Ed Sheeran, Shawn Mendes, Kevin Hart, Wiz Khalifa, Charlie Puth, Katy Perry, and Leonardo DiCaprio. The song was made to raise awareness about the environment, pollution, and climate change. Burd stated that a portion of the song's proceeds are being donated to a variety of environmental charities.

In 2020, Burd and producer Jeff Schaffer created a television comedy series based on Burd's life called Dave, which premiered on FXX in March 2020. The show's second season aired in 2021 and it has been renewed for a third season.

Early life 
Burd was born in Cheltenham Township on the north border of Philadelphia and grew up in an upper-middle-class Jewish family in the Elkins Park neighborhood. He was born with "a tangled urethra" and hypospadias, in which the urethra does not open from its usual location in the head of the penis, requiring multiple surgeries.

Burd's interest in music started when he was a child, listening to hip hop and alternative rock. He began rapping in the fifth grade after doing a history report on Alexander Pushkin using rap music. In his youth, the hip-hop and rap music artists Burd listened to most were Nas and Jay-Z.

Burd attended Cheltenham High School. Speaking about his time in high school, Burd said "I was a pussy. I was really awkward looking. I wasn't getting any girls at all, but I was very class-clownish and I got good grades." After graduating from high school, Burd began attending the University of Richmond, where fellow 2016 XXL Freshman and rapper Dave East also attended at the same time. Burd graduated summa cum laude in 2010.

After college, Burd relocated to San Francisco, California where he worked in account management at the advertising agency Goodby, Silverstein & Partners. After reimagining his monthly progress report as a rap video, the company brought him to work in their creative department, where he wrote copy for ads such as the NBA's "BIG" campaign.

Career 

Burd says he initiated his rap career "simply to get attention comedically, so [he] could write movies, write TV shows and act". However, he "fell in love with rapping" and says he's "not leaving that game until [he's] proved [his] point".

Burd began working on his debut mixtape, So Hard, in 2011. The mixtape took Burd over two years to finish because he still had his day job at Goodby, Silverstein & Partners during its development. Burd recorded a majority of his early material for So Hard on his MacBook Pro and a $400 microphone; in 2013 he began releasing one song per week for five months straight. On April 23, 2013, Burd released the music video for his song "Ex-Boyfriend", the mixtape's leading single. The music video received one million views within 24 hours of being posted on YouTube. Burd released a new song or music video, in a series titled Hump Days. Following the release of 32 songs and 15 music videos, Burd launched a Kickstarter, stating, "I've officially run out of money... In a nutshell, you are funding phase two of my rap career." The month-long crowdfunding period began on November 20, 2013, with the goal of raising $70,000 in order to enable Burd to create and produce more music, music videos, and go touring. The Kickstarter well exceeded its target, raising $113,000.

Burd held his first live concert at TLA in Philadelphia on February 19, 2014. Burd signed with CMSN, which also manages Tyga and Chiddy Bang. He plans on "having two concurrent careers going on, as a rapper, and as a comedian/actor/writer". Burd released his debut album Professional Rapper on July 31, 2015, and features artists Snoop Dogg, T-Pain, Rich Homie Quan, Fetty Wap, Brendon Urie (Panic! at the Disco), RetroJace and Hannibal Buress. Burd appeared in a 2016 Funny or Die video "Watch Yo Self" with Mystikal and Trinidad James. On June 13, 2016, XXL Magazine released the 2016 Freshmen line-up. It included Burd, along with Anderson .Paak, Kodak Black, Lil Uzi Vert, 21 Savage, Dave East, Denzel Curry, Desiigner, G Herbo, and Lil Yachty.

On April 12, 2017, Burd released a music video for "Pillow Talking". Its special effects made it the 49th most expensive music video ever created. In an interview with XXL in April 2017, Burd mentioned that he was creating a new project and that he was also attempting to pitch a TV show to networks. In September 2017, Burd released an EP under his alter ego Brain, I'm Brain. On March 15, 2018, Burd released a new single, "Freaky Friday", featuring Chris Brown, and the associated music video. By April 9, 2018, the video had reached over 100 million views and topped the charts in New Zealand and the United Kingdom. On April 2, 2018, Burd announced his first Australian tour; he previously studied abroad for two years in Melbourne.

On April 19, 2019, Burd released a single called "Earth", featuring artists such as Ariana Grande, Justin Bieber, Ed Sheeran, and Shawn Mendes. They all voice various animated organisms in the music video. The music video, which was created in partnership with the Leonardo DiCaprio Foundation, aimed at encouraging better environmental practices worldwide. Upon release Burd referred to the project as "the most important thing [he'll] ever do."

Burd and Jeff Schafer created a TV series called Dave, which portrays a fictionalized version of Burd's life as a rapper. It stars Burd, Taylor Misiak, and Christine Ko. The show premiered on March 4, 2020, on FXX. On May 11, 2020, Dave was renewed for a second season, which aired in 2021.

Musical style and influences 
Burd's style blends the comical with the relatable. According to Boston magazine, "Content-wise, Burd comes up with his material from everyday occurrences and everyday experiences. From there, he crafts his videos around those topics to create a visual narrative that accompanies his talent as an emcee. 'It's like a comedian. They are out in the world, and writing things down,' he said. What followed 'Ex-Boyfriend' was a series of other videos that covered similarly average everyday experiences—songs about staying in for the night, songs about being a Jewish kid—he also has a rap battle with Adolf Hitler in one of his videos."

Burd describes his style as a response to the excessive egotistical nature of rap today: "I really wanted to embody the exact opposite of that, and I think people are appreciating it. There just hasn't been a voice for that normal dude when it comes to rap." He added, "I think a lot of rap is just escalated to a place that many people can't relate to... My niche is that I'm relatable. I don't rap about going to the club and popping bottles." In terms of his rapping skills, Burd is able "to manipulate words at an excessive speed, and weave rhyme patterns together in a way that's funny while also making viewers want to rewind parts of his videos".

Burd says his musical inspirations are J. Cole, A$AP Rocky, Snoop Dogg, as well as Childish Gambino, whom he refers to as "a guy with similar aspirations."

Discography 

Professional Rapper (2015)

Filmography

Tours

References

External links 

 
 Lil Dicky on SoundCloud
 Lil Dicky on YouTube

1988 births
American comedy musicians
Jewish American male comedians
American male rappers
East Coast hip hop musicians
Jewish American musicians
Jewish rappers
Living people
People from Cheltenham, Pennsylvania
Rappers from Philadelphia
Rappers from the San Francisco Bay Area
University of Richmond alumni
21st-century American rappers
21st-century American comedians
Pop rappers
21st-century American male musicians
21st-century American Jews